The 2021–22 UT Arlington Mavericks men's basketball team represented the University of Texas at Arlington in the 2021–22 NCAA Division I men's basketball season. The Mavericks, led by first-year head coach Greg Young, played their home games at the College Park Center in Arlington, Texas as members of the Sun Belt Conference's West Division.

On January 21, 2022, UT Arlington announced that it would be the last season for the team in the Sun Belt as they will rejoin the Western Athletic Conference on July 1, 2022.

Previous season
The Mavericks finished the 2020–21 season 13–13, 9–8 in Sun Belt play to finish in third place in the West Division. They were defeated by Troy in the first round of the Sun Belt tournament.

On April 1, 2021, it was announced that head coach Chris Ogden was hired as an assistant coach at his alma mater, Texas. Four days later, on April 5, associate head coach Greg Young was elevated to head coach.

Roster

Schedule and results

|-
!colspan=12 style=| Exhibition

|-
!colspan=12 style=| Non-conference regular season

|-
!colspan=9 style=| Sun Belt Conference regular season

|-
!colspan=12 style=| Sun Belt tournament

|-

Source

References

UT Arlington Mavericks men's basketball seasons
UT Arlington Mavericks
UT Arlington Mavericks men's basketball
UT Arlington Mavericks men's basketball